Dashkriya is a 2017 Marathi language film directed by Sandeep Bhalchandra Patil, produced by Kalpana Vilas Kothari. The film starring Manoj Joshi, Dilip Prabhawalkar, Aditi Deshpande, Nandkishor Choughule and Milind Shinde. The film won the National Film Award for Best Feature Film in Marathi at India's 64th National Film Awards. The film was released on 17 November 2017.

Synopsis 
Amid undercurrents of rebellion, priests like Keshav make money hand over fist by commercializing Dashakriya, a post-cremation ritual. Young coin diver Banya gets acquainted with the tricks of their trade and puts it to good use in an hour of need.

Cast 
 Manoj Joshi
 Dilip Prabhawalkar
 Aditi Deshpande
 Nandkishor Choughule
 Milind Shinde
 Milind Phatak
 Santosh Mayekar 
 Uma Sardeshmukh

Soundtrack

Critical reception 
Dashakriya received Positive reviews from critics. A Reviewer of 
Divya Marathi gave the film 4 stars out of 5 and says "Dashkriya' exposes the looting in the name of religion". Mukund Kule of Maharashtra Times gave the film 3 stars out of 5 and wrote "The rest of the technical aspects of the movie are also fine. Songs appear here and there. But the content of the movie is strong. That same feeling is consumed". Ganesh Matkari of Pune Mirror wrote "In the end, Dashakriya feels like a missed opportunity, a possibility of a great film, settling merely for an average one".

Controversy 
In the movie Dashakriya, Brahmins and Hindu traditions have been defamed. Therefore, the Akhil Bharatiya Brahmin Mahasabha demanded that his exhibition be banned. The Aurangabad bench of the Bombay High Court dismissed the plea seeking a ban on the film. Freedom of speech and expression is inevitable. The High Court expressed the opinion that a creative person should get freedom of expression within the ambit of law through plays, movies etc.

References

External links
 

2017 films
2010s Marathi-language films
Indian drama films
Marathi cinema